"Arche-writing" is a term used by French philosopher Jacques Derrida in his attempt to re-orient the relationship between speech and writing. 

Derrida argued that as far back as Plato, speech had been always given priority over writing. In the West, phonetic writing was considered as a secondary imitation of speech, a poor copy of the immediate living act of speech. Derrida argued that in later centuries philosopher Jean-Jacques Rousseau and linguist Ferdinand de Saussure both gave writing a secondary or parasitic role. In Derrida's essay Plato's Pharmacy, he sought to question this prioritising by firstly complicating the two terms speech and writing.

According to Derrida, this complication is visible in the Greek word φάρμακον pharmakon, which meant both "cure" and "poison". Derrida noted that Plato argued that writing was "poisonous" to memory, since writing is a mere repetition, as compared to the living memory required for speech. Derrida points out however, that since both speech and writing rely upon repetition they cannot be completely distinguished.

In the neologism arche-writing, "arche-" meaning "origin, principle, or telos", attempts to go beyond the simple division of writing/speech. Arche-writing refers to a kind of writing that precedes both speech and writing. Derrida argued that arche-writing is, in a sense, language, in that it is already there before we use it, it already has a pregiven, yet malleable, structure/genesis, which is a semi-fixed set-up of different words and syntax. This fixedness is the writing to which Derrida refers, just such a 'writing' can even be seen in cultures that do not employ writing, it could be seen in notches on a rope or barrel, fixed customs, or placements around the living areas.

References

Philosophy of language
Post-structuralism
Writing